Enemy Agent is a 1940 American spy thriller film directed by Lew Landers and starring Richard Cromwell, Helen Vinson, and Robert Armstrong. The supporting cast includes Jack La Rue, Jack Carson, Philip Dorn and Milburn Stone. It was produced and distributed by Universal Studios

Synopsis
A network of enemy agents infiltrate an aircraft factory to gain the plans on the United States' war preparations. A draughtsmen at the plant grows suspicious and so they attempt to frame him in the eyes of the FBI investators.

Cast

 Richard Cromwell as Jimmy Saunders
 Helen Vinson as 	Irene Hunter
 Robert Armstrong as Gordon
 Marjorie Reynolds as Peggy O'Reilly
 Vinton Hayworth as Lester Taylor 
 Russell Hicks as 	Lyman Scott
 Philip Dorn as 	Doctor Jeffry Arnold
 Jack La Rue as Alex
 Bradley Page as Francis
 Abner Biberman as Baronoff
 Luis Alberni as 	A. Calteroni
 Jack Carson as 	Ralph
 Milburn Stone as	Meeker
 Henry Victor as 	Karl 
 Steve Pendleton as Mickey 
 Victor Potel as 	George 
 Ernie Adams as	Janitor
 Lloyd Ingraham as 	Barber 
 Jean De Briac as Barber 
 Brooks Benedict as Headwaiter 
 Tom Steele as Police Car 57 Driver 
 James Craig as Federal Agent

References

Bibliography
 McLaughlin, Robert. We'll Always Have the Movies: American Cinema during World War II. University Press of Kentucky, 2006.

External links
 Enemy Agent in the Internet Movie Database

1940 films
American spy thriller films
Films directed by Lew Landers
1940s spy thriller films
Universal Pictures films
American black-and-white films
1940s English-language films
1940s American films